Demba Steven Camara van Leeuwen (born 19 October 2000) is a professional footballer who plays as a forward for Cypriot club Elia Lythrodonta. Born in the Netherlands, van Leeuwen represents the Mali national football team.

Career
In September 2020, van Leeuwen joined Cypriot side APEA Akrotiri.

International career
Van Leeuwen was born in the Netherlands to a Malian father and Dutch mother. He made his debut for the Mali national football team in a friendly 1–2 loss over South Africa on 13 October 2019.

References

External links
 

2000 births
Malian people of Dutch descent
Dutch people of Malian descent
Dutch sportspeople of African descent
Footballers from Amsterdam
Living people
Malian footballers
Mali international footballers
Dutch footballers
Association football forwards
FC Dordrecht players
Malian expatriate footballers
Expatriate footballers in Cyprus
Malian expatriate sportspeople in Cyprus